Arthur "Alf" Moore (3 August 1872 – 15 July 1950) was an Australian rules footballer who played for the Carlton Football Club in the Victorian Football League (VFL).

Notes

External links 

Alf Moore's profile at Blueseum

1872 births
Australian rules footballers from Victoria (Australia)
Carlton Football Club players
1950 deaths